Yellow Hedgerow Dreamscape is a compilation album by British progressive rock band Porcupine Tree (at that time a pseudonym for private solo projects by Steven Wilson but later a fully fledged band in its own right). It is a compilation of the band's initial three tapes, Tarquin's Seaweed Farm, Love, Death & Mussolini and The Nostalgia Factory. It consists of the rest of the music from the tapes that was not included in the band's first studio album On the Sunday of Life... and a previously unreleased track "An Empty Box".

The album was first released in 1994 as a limited run of 2,500 CD copies. In 2000, Gates of Dawn re-released the album as a double LP edition pressed on yellow vinyl, limited to 1000 copies, and on black vinyl up to 150 copies. 300 extra copies were pressed on green vinyl in 2005. Note that the vinyl version omits Steven's cover of Prince's song "The Cross", replacing it with the song "Out", from the Love, Death & Mussolini cassette. In May 2013, a reissue of Yellow Hedgerow Dreamscape became available to purchase exclusively through the Headphone Dust online store. It uses the vinyl track list. The vinyl edition of the album, using the mastering for the 2013 CD, was reissued in 2017 in the box set The Delerium Years 1991–1993.

Two tracks from the Love, Death & Mussolini EP and The Nostalgia Factory have different titles on Yellow Hedgerow Dreamscape: "Colours Dance Angels Kiss" was renamed as "Track 11" and "Hokey Cokey" was renamed as "Execution of the Will of the Marquis de Sade". The main melodic motif from "Mute" was reused in Wilson's other main project at the time, No-Man, for the song "Days in the Trees."

CD track listing (1994)
"Mute" – 8:05
"Landscare" – 2:58
"Prayer" – 1:38
"Daughters in Excess" – 6:34
"Delightful Suicide" – 1:04
"Split Image" – 1:53
"No Reason to Live, No Reason to Die" – 11:07
"Wastecoat" – 1:11
"Towel" – 3:37
"Execution of the Will of the Marquis de Sade" – 5:07
"Track 11" – 3:00
"Radioactive Toy" – 5:57
"An Empty Box" – 3:12
"The Cross / Yellow Hedgerow Dreamscape" – 20:44
"Music for the Head" – 1:23

Double vinyl track listing (2000/2005/2017) and CD reissue (2013)
"Mute" – 8:08
"Landscare" – 3:02
"Prayer" – 1:35
"Daughters in Excess" – 6:35
"Delightful Suicide" – 1:09
"Split Image" – 1:52
"No Reason to Live, No Reason to Die" – 11:06
"Wastecoat" – 1:11
"Towel" – 3:37
"Execution of the Will of the Marquis de Sade" – 5:08
"Track 11" – 3:00
"Radioactive Toy" – 5:59
"An Empty Box" – 3:19
"Out" – 8:58
"Yellow Hedgerow Dreamscape" – 10:45
"Music for the Head" – 1:30

References

Porcupine Tree compilation albums
1994 compilation albums